Arthur Ritchie may refer to:

 Arthur Brown Ritchie (1885–1977), Canadian politician
 Arthur David Ritchie (1891–1967), British philosopher
 Arthur Ritchie (priest) (1849-1921), American Anglo-Catholic priest